The Eurovision Song Contest 1987 was the 32nd edition of the annual Eurovision Song Contest. Organised by the European Broadcasting Union (EBU) and host broadcaster Radio-télévision belge de la Communauté française (RTBF), the contest was held at the Centenary Palace on 9 May 1987 (also Europe Day) and hosted by French-Belgian singer Viktor Lazlo.

This set the record for the highest number of competing countries up until that point.

He remains the only performer to have won the Eurovision Song Contest twice.

Location

The contest took place at the Brussels Exhibition Centre (Brussels Expo) in Brussels, Belgium. These are a set of exhibition halls built from 1930 on the Heysel/Heizel Plateau (Heysel Park) in Laeken (northern part of the City of Brussels) to celebrate the centenary of Belgian Independence. The Centenary Palace, where the main stage was located, is one of the remaining buildings of the Brussels International Exposition of 1935. Currently, it is still being used for trade fairs, as well as concerts, usually for bigger acts and artists.

Format

Host broadcaster rule
Before Sandra Kim won, Belgium was the one with the worst historical record, being the only one not to have won the contest. Despite being the big favorite in bookmakers, the Belgian victory in Bergen the previous year was controversial because the age of the contestant was unknown. Since the start of voting with an early and consolidated win with 172 points, Belgium ended a wait of exactly 30 years and finally became the last country of the 7 founders of the contest to win its first triumph, but the internal situation in the country was so complex that it was a separate chapter in the history of the contest until then and spilled directly into the organization of the next edition.

Sandra Kim's Eurovision victory in 1986 occurred amidst a complex political situation in Belgium: In the 1980s, the country was undergoing massive constitutional reforms in which the Belgian state was no longer centralized and unitary, instead being transformed into a decentralized and federative system. This was due to rising tensions between the two major linguistic regions of Belgium, Dutch-speaking Flanders and French-speaking Wallonia. Both regions had had independent broadcasters since 1960 (BRT in Flanders and RTBF in Wallonia) but had still agreed to jointly host the contest in the event of a Belgian victory. While the triumph of "" in 1986an entry sent by French-speaking RTBFreignited a sense of national union across all Belgian regions,  the two regional broadcasters weren't able to overcome their disagreements and  joint host the competition . During the production of the event, BRT eventually withdrew from the project and RTBF organised the contest alone as host broadcaster . BRT remained in charge of the selection of the Belgian entry for the contest, up until 1993. Thirty-three years later, in her academic study "Which Belgium Won Eurovision? European Unity and Belgian Disunity" published in 2019, the scholar Julie Kalman describes how, as a consequence, the host country images in Eurovision 1987 mostly showed footage of Wallonia.

Host city selection process

During the process to choose the host city and the venue, a joint committee was created and had members from both broadcasting companies. Nevertheless, RTBF demanded the event had to be held in Brussels with the argument that the city had a symbolism in several areas that transcend Belgium itself, in addition to its headquarters and the federal functions as the capital of the country. Additionally, almost all the bodies of the European Union were also located there. Due to these unique features, Brussels fit perfectly as the host city, with the probable date for the contest being European Day (May 9th). On 6 October 1986, 7 months and three days before the contest, RTBF surprisingly and one-sidedly announced that the Palais du Centenaire was chosen as the host venue for the Eurovision Song Contest in 1987. The Flemish leading newspaper , published that BRT proposed instead to host the contest at the Cirque Royal, near the Royal Palace of Brussels, adding that RTBF would be solely in charge of organizing the contest if BRT's counteroffer was not chosen. However, RTBF moved forward with the plans and confirmed that the Palais du Centenaire was the official contest's host venue. BRT was offended by the choice of Brussels as the host city, and withdrew from the organization, but kept the duties to choose the host's country contestant.

Budget
Holding the contest in Belgium caused several legal changes in the country system and forced the implementation of most of the modern rules and regulations on the monetization of public television. This led to the authorization of the use of advertising, sponsorships and marketing actions in the two public channels in the country. As a consequence, the RTBF was also allowed to sell sponsorship quotas for the event, setting a new precedent for the Eurovision Song Contest. This was because the available budget decreased with the departure of BRT. For the RTBF, this decision was a relief, as the event was almost entirely with private funds, with no money from the local population. For the sponsors, this was very beneficial, as their brands appeared for millions of people throughout most of the event. This opened the doors to the commercial potential of the event itself, starting a period of modernization and increased interest for the event. Apart from the latent tensions, after the end of the contest, the then-BRT President Cas Goossens praised RTBF for their "perfect organization" while at the same time regretting that the two broadcasters weren't able to collaborate. He added that the cost of hosting Eurovision would have been difficult to justify to the Flemish taxpayers.

Contest overview
The 1987 Eurovision was the biggest contest to date, and it was also the first in which 22 countries competed. Only ,  and  failed to compete out of all the countries which had entered the contest in the past. The large number of participating countries caused some problems for the EBU, which ranged from the available dates for the rehearsals to the readjustment of the duration of the televised finale. Due to this situation, after the contest, the EBU set the limit of participating countries to 22. This was a problematic question over the next five years as new and returning nations indicated an interest in participating, but they could not be accommodated.

During the national selection period, a lot of controversy erupted in Israel after their song, "Shir Habatlanim" by the Lazy Bums, was selected. The comedic duo performance was criticised by the country's culture minister, who threatened to resign should the duo proceed to Brussels. After fierce discussion, they were allowed to perform for Israel, placing eighth; however the culture minister's threat was left unfulfilled.

Another controversy happened when the singer Viktor Lazlo was invited to be the contest presenter. With a few days delay, she agreed to sign the contract, but added a clause related to the fact that she would have to perform with a song from her repertoire as she was releasing a new album at that time. The chosen song was the lead single from that album, namely "Breathless".

Participating countries

Conductors
Each performance had a conductor who directed the orchestra.

 Terje Fjærn
 Kobi Oshrat
 Richard Oesterreicher
 Hjálmar H. Ragnarsson
 
 Curt-Eric Holmquist
 
 Jaime Oliveira
 Eduardo Leiva
 Garo Mafyan
 Yiorgos Niarchos
 Rogier van Otterloo
 
 Ronnie Hazlehurst
 Jean-Claude Petit
 Laszlo Bencker
 
 Ossi Runne
 
 Noel Kelehan
 
 no conductor

Returning artists
Bold indicates a previous winner.

Participants and results

Detailed voting results

12 points 
Below is a summary of all 12 points in the final:

Spokespersons 

Each country announced their votes in the order of performance. The following is a list of spokespersons who announced the votes for their respective country.

 
 Yitzhak Shim'oni
 
 Guðrún Skúladóttir
 An Ploegaerts
 
 
 Ana Zanatti
 Matilde Jarrín
 Canan Kumbasar
 Irini Gavala
 
 Frédérique Ries
 Colin Berry
 
 Anna Partelidou
 Solveig Herlin
 
 Brendan Balfe
 Ljiljana Tipsarević
 Michel Stocker

Broadcasts 

Each participating broadcaster was required to relay the contest via its networks. Non-participating EBU member broadcasters were also able to relay the contest as "passive participants". Broadcasters were able to send commentators to provide coverage of the contest in their own native language and to relay information about the artists and songs to their television viewers. Known details on the broadcasts in each country, including the specific broadcasting stations and commentators are shown in the tables below.

See also
Eurovision Young Dancers 1987

Notes

References

External links

 
1987
Music festivals in Belgium
1987 in music
1987 in Belgium
1980s in Brussels
May 1987 events in Europe
Events in Brussels